Eduardo Torroja y Miret, 1st Marques of Torroja (27 August 1899 – 15 June 1961) was a Spanish structural engineer and a pioneer in the design of concrete shell structures.

Education
Torroja was born in Madrid where he studied civil engineering.

Career

In 1923 Torroja began work for the Hidrocivil company, headed by the engineer José Eugenio Ribera. 
He planned and directed various types of projects, including the foundations of bridge piers, bridges, water supply and sanitation works, and various urban buildings.
Torroja's first large project was the Tempul cable-stayed aqueduct (1926) in Guadalete, Jerez de la Frontera, in which he used pre-stressed girders.
In 1928 he established his own office.

Modesto López Otero, director for the Madrid University City (Ciudad Universitaria de Madrid) project, formed a diverse team of young architects to design the various buildings.
Torroja joined the group in 1929. 
He worked with Manuel Sánchez Arcas, sharing his interest in new architectural forms that rejected preconceived formulas.
The first collaborative work of Torroja and Sanchez Arcas was the pavilion of the Construction Commission of the university city, completed in June 1931.
They worked on the heating plant (Central Térmica) and the clinical hospital for the university city.

Sánchez Arcas and Torroja designed an enclosed and semi-spherical shell for the 1932 Algeciras market hall.
As an engineering work it is considered Torroja's masterpiece.
Sánchez Arcas and Torroja founded the journal Hormigón y Acero (Concrete and Steel).
In 1934 they founded the Instituto Técnico de la Construcción y Edificación (ITCE, Technical Institute of Construction and Building).
Other founding members were the architect Modesto López Otero (1885–1962) and the engineers José María Aguirre Gonzalo (1897–1988) and Alfonso Peña Boeuf (1888–1966). 
The ITCE was a non-profit organization dedicated to developing and applying technical innovations in engineering civil structures.

In 1952, Eduardo Torroja – along with André Balency-Béran, Emile Nenning, Louis Baes, Hubert Hüsch and Georg Wästlund – founded the Comité Européen du Béton, which is now the Fédération Internationale du Béton. The Comité Européen du Béton sought to coordinate the research effort on structural concrete in Europe following the end of the Second World War.

Eduardo Torroja designed the thin-shell water tower in Fedala and the roof of the "La Zarzuela" racetrack in Madrid in the form of a hyperboloid.
He also used steel with great élan, as at the roof of the Football Stadium, Barcelona (1943). He designed innovative structures in numerous parts of the world, including Morocco and Latin America. His books include Philosophy of Structures (1958) and The Structures of Eduardo Torroja (1958).

Personal characteristics 

Torroja believed that a structure should reflect the personality of its designer. Some believe every specific twist and turn in a structure reflects an important event in one's life. Believing in the latter, Torroja developed new ways of looking at structures as well as ways to increase the strength of the structures without dimming aesthetics. Torroja illustrated an interest in forms of art that dwindled within most of his structures which often incorporated his visions.

Socioeconomic and political environment
In the 1920s, Europe was left in ruins to struggle with economic and political recovery. Since Spain was short on steel supplies, Torroja had to pursue other materials. 
In his search for new materials, Torroja became famous for his exploration of alternative uses for horse manure, which was found to be a strong and cheap in-cost material. Today, Torroja is renowned for his development of reinforced concrete.

References

Sources

Further reading
 Eduardo Torroja: The Structures of Eduardo Torroja, Ministerio de Fomento, Madrid, 2000
 Eduardo Torroja: Philosophy of Structures, University of California Press, Los Angeles, 1958, (translated by Jaroslav Joseph Polivka with Milos Polivka)

External links

 Eduardo Torroja y Miret
 Photos of Works by Eduardo Torroja
 The structures of Eduardo Torroja

Spanish architects
20th-century Spanish engineers
Structural engineers
Bridge engineers
Concrete pioneers
Concrete shell structures
1899 births
1961 deaths
Spanish civil engineers